The Miss Kansas competition is the pageant that selects the representative for the US state of Kansas in the Miss America pageant. Kansas has won the Miss America crown on three occasions.

Ayanna Hensley of Dodge City was crowned Miss Kansas 2022 on June 11, 2022 at Dennis Lesh Sports Arena at Pratt Community College in Pratt. She competed for the title of Miss America 2023 at the Mohegan Sun in Uncasville, Connecticut in December 2022.

Results summary
The following is a visual summary of the past results of Miss Kansas titleholders at the national Miss America pageants/competitions. The year in parentheses indicates the year of the national competition during which a placement and/or award was garnered, not the year attached to the contestant's state title.

Placements
 Miss Americas: Deborah Irene Bryant (1966), Debra Dene Barnes (1968), Tara Dawn Holland (1997)
 2nd runners-up: Michelle Elaine Whitson (1980)
 3rd runners-up: Vera June Ralston (1948), Mary Ann McGrew (1957) (tie), Pamela McKelvy (1993)
 Top 10: Sandy Rings (1972), Cynthia Sikes (1973), Lori Ann Bergen (1979), Robbin Lee Wasson (1992), Trisha Schaffer (1995), Amy Keller (1996), Megan Bushell (2005), Theresa Vail (2014)
 Top 15: Shirley Hargiss (1949), Annika Wooton (2020)
 Top 16: Lucia Benton (1937)

Awards

Preliminary awards
 Preliminary Lifestyle and Fitness: Vera June Ralston (1948), Deborah Irene Bryant (1966), Debra Dene Barnes (1968), Cynthia Sikes (1973), Karen Dianne Smith (1975), Amy Keller (1996), Tara Dawn Holland (1997)
 Preliminary Talent: Sandy Rings (1972), Lori Ann Bergen (1979), Pamela McKelvy (1993), Trisha Schaffer (1995)

Non-finalist awards
 Non-finalist Talent: Sharon O'Neal (1960), Karen Raye Schwartz (1964), Karen Diane Smith (1975), Jill Dirks (1978), Laura Lynn Watters (1984), Kimberly Dugger (1991), Angelea Busby (2004), Annika Wooton (2020)

Other awards
 America's Choice: Theresa Vail (2014)
 Children's Miracle Network (CMN) Miracle Maker Award 1st runners-up:  Hannah Klaassen (2019)
 CMN Miracle Maker Award 2nd runners-up:  Kendall Schoenekase (2017)
 Eleanor "Big Mama" Andrews Performing Arts Award: Kimberlee Grice (2002)
 Quality of Life Award/Social Impact Initiative Scholarship Award Winners: Annika Wooton (2020)
 Quality of Life Award 1st runners-up: Tara Dawn Holland (1997), Kendall Schoenekase (2017)
 Quality of Life Award Finalists: Megan Bushell (2005), Adrienne Rosel (2006), Krystian Fish (2018)
 STEM Scholarship Award Winners: Kendall Schoenekase (2017)

Winners

Notes

References

External links
 Miss Kansas official website

Kansas culture
Kansas
Women in Kansas
1924 establishments in Kansas
Recurring events established in 1924
Annual events in Kansas